Fisher is an English occupational name for one who obtained a living by fishing. In the United States, it is also a common anglicization of the German "Fischer" as well as various Ashkenazi Jewish surnames.

Notable people

A
Aaron R. Fisher (1895–1985), United States Army officer
Abbi Fisher (born 1957), American alpine skier
Abby Fisher (1831–?), American slave and writer
Ada Fisher (1947-2022), American physician and politician
Ada Lois Sipuel Fisher (1924-1995), American civil rights activist
Adam Fisher, American baseball executive
Adrian Fisher (maze designer) (born 1951), maze designer
Adrian Fisher (musician) (1952–2000), British musician
Adrian S. Fisher (1914–1983), American lawyer
Aileen Fisher (1906–2002), American writer
Aimee Fisher (born 1995), New Zealand canoeist
Al Fisher (born 1986), American basketball player
Alan Fisher (disambiguation), multiple people
Alastair Fisher, Scottish rugby union player
Albert Fisher (disambiguation), multiple people
Alexander Fisher (disambiguation) or Alex Fisher, multiple people
Alexandra Fisher (born 1988), Kazakhstani shot putter
Alfred Fisher, English rugby league player
Alice Fisher (disambiguation), multiple people
Allan George Barnard Fisher, New Zealand-born economist
Allen Fisher (born 1944), British poet
Allison Fisher (born 1968), English pool and snooker player
Almond E. Fisher (1913–1982), United States Army officer and Medal of Honor recipient
Alvan Fisher (1792–1863), American painter
Alvin Fisher (1893–1937), Canadian ice hockey player
Amanda Fisher, British cell biologist
Amy Fisher (born 1974), American criminal
Andrew Fisher (disambiguation) or Andy Fisher, multiple people
Angie Fisher, American singer
Anna Fisher (disambiguation), multiple people
Anne Fisher (disambiguation), multiple people
Annie Fisher (1867–1938), American cook and entrepreneur
Anthony Fisher (disambiguation) or Antony Fisher, multiple people
Antwone Fisher (born 1959), the subject of a 2002 film based on his life
Archie Fisher (born 1939), Scottish folk singer
Archie Fisher (painter) (1896–1959), New Zealand painter
Arnie Fisher (born 1938), American bridge player
Arthur Fisher (disambiguation), multiple people
Ashley Fisher (born 1975), Australian tennis player
Ashley Lauren Fisher (born 1975), American model and restaurateur
A.S.T. Fisher (20th century), English clergyman and writer
Avery Fisher (1906–1994), American audio engineer

B
B. H. Fisher ("Red" Fisher, 1914–2006), American writer and outdoorsman
Barb Fisher (fl. c. 2000), Canadian politician
Barbara Loe Fisher (fl. late 20th century), American chiropractor
Ben Fisher (born 1981), Scottish rugby league player
Benjamin Fisher (1842–1920), Australian accountant and auctioneer
Benjamin F. Fisher (1834–1915), American general
Bernard Fisher (disambiguation), multiple people
Bernice Fisher (1916–1966), American civil rights activist
Bertie Fisher (1878–1972), British general
Beth Fisher (artist) (born 1944), American artist
Bob Fisher (disambiguation), multiple people
Bobby Fisher (footballer) (born 1956), English footballer
Brad Fisher (born 1984), Australian rules footballer
Brandy Fisher (born 1975), American women's ice hockey player
Brenda Fisher (1927–2022), English long-distance swimmer
Brent Fisher (born 1983), New Zealand footballer
Brian Fisher (disambiguation) or Bryan Fisher, multiple people
Bruce Fisher (born 1954), American songwriter, record producer and playwright 
Bryce Fisher (born 1977), American football player
Bud Fisher (1885–1954), American cartoonist

C
Carl Anthony Fisher (1945–1993), American Roman Catholic bishop
Carl G. Fisher (1874–1939), American entrepreneur
Carlos Fisher (born 1983), American baseball player
Carrie Fisher (1956–2016), American actress, writer and humorist
Catherine Fisher (disambiguation), multiple people
Cathrew Fisher (1871–1929), English Anglican bishop
Celia B. Fisher, American developmental psychologist
Cevin Fisher (born 1963), American music producer
C. B. Fisher (1817–1908) Australian pastoralist and racehorse breeder
Charles Fisher (disambiguation) or Charlie Fisher, multiple people
Charron Fisher (born 1985), American basketball player
Cherokee Fisher (1844–1912), American baseball player
Chris Fisher (born 1971), American film and television director, writer and producer
Chris Fisher (athlete) (born 1949), Australian middle-distance runner
Cicely Corbett Fisher (1885–1959), British suffragist
Cilla Fisher (born 1952), founding member of The Singing Kettle
Cindy Fisher (born 1964), American women's basketball coach
Cindy Fisher (actress) (born 1960), American actress
Clara Fisher (1811–1898), English actress
Clarence Fisher (1898–1965), American baseball player
Clarence Stanley Fisher (1876–1941), American archaeologist
Clarkson Sherman Fisher (1921–1997), American judge
Clem Fisher (1908–1988), Australian rules footballer
Clement Fisher (disambiguation), multiple people
C. Miller Fisher (1913–2012), Canadian neurologist
Col Fisher (1923–2003), Australian politician
Colin Fisher (born 1949), Scottish rugby union player
Connie Fisher (born 1983), British actress, singer and television presenter
Constance Fisher (1929–1973), American serial killer
Corey Fisher (born 1988), American basketball player
Craig Fisher (born 1970), Canadian ice hockey player
Craig B. Fisher (1932–2006), American television producer
Cynthia Fisher (born 1961), American businesswoman

D
Daisy Fisher (1888–1967), English writer and playwright
Dana R. Fisher, American sociologist
Daniel Fisher (disambiguation), Danny Fisher or Dan Fisher, multiple people
Danielle Fisher (born 1985), American mountain climber
Darius Fisher, English filmmaker and producer
Darnell Fisher (born 1994), English footballer
Darren Fisher (born 1965), Canadian politician
Darren Paul Fisher, British screenwriter, film producer and director
Darryl Fisher (born 1976), New Zealand rugby league player, coach and administrator
David Fisher (disambiguation), multiple people
Davis Fisher (born 1997), American motorcycle racer
Dean Fisher (born 1956), American politician
Denys Fisher (1918–2002), English engineer and inventor
Derek Fisher (born 1974), American basketball player and coach
Derek Fisher (baseball) (born 1993), American baseball player
Devon Fisher (born 1993), American soccer player
Diane Gilliam Fisher (born 1957), American poet
D. Michael Fisher (born 1944), American judge
Don Fisher (1916–1973), American baseball player
Donald Fisher (1928–2009), American entrepreneur
Doris Fisher (disambiguation), multiple people
Dorothy Canfield Fisher (1879–1958), American author
Douglas Fisher (disambiguation) or Doug Fisher, multiple people
Dudley Fisher (1890–1951), American cartoonist
Dudu Fisher (born 1951), Israeli cantor, actor and singer
Dunc Fisher (1927–2017), Canadian ice hockey player

E
Ebon Fisher, American artist
Ed Fisher (disambiguation), multiple people
Eddie Fisher (drummer) (born 1973), American drummer
Eddie Fisher (singer) (1928–2010), American singer
Edmund Fisher (architect) (1872–1918), British architect
Edmund Fisher (publisher) (1939–1995), British publisher
Edward Fisher (disambiguation) or Eddie Fisher, multiple people
Edwin Fisher (disambiguation), multiple people
Eileen Fisher (born 1950), American clothing designer and businesswoman
Elizabeth Fisher (disambiguation), multiple people
Ellen Thayer Fisher (1847–1911), American botanical illustrator
Elliott S. Fisher, American health researcher and advocate
Elmer H. Fisher (1840–1905), American architect
Else Fisher (1918–2006), Swedish choreographer, dancer, theatre director and writer
Elsie Fisher (born 2003), American actress
Elvis Fisher (born 1988), American football player
Emmanuel Fisher (1921–2001), British composer and conductor
English Fisher (c. 1928–2011), American boxing trainer
Ephraim S. Fisher (1815–1876), justice of the Mississippi High Court of Errors and Appeals
Eric Fisher (cricketer) (1924–1996), New Zealand cricketer
Eric Fisher (American football) (born 1991), American football offensive tackle
Erik Fisher (born 1985), American alpine skier
Ezra Fisher (1800–1874), American Baptist missionary and pioneer

F
Florrie Fisher (1918–1972), American motivational speaker
Frances Fisher (born 1952), British-American actress
Francesca Fisher-Eastwood (born 1993), American actress
Francis Fisher (1877–1960), New Zealand politician
Frank Fisher (disambiguation), multiple people
Franklin M. Fisher (1934–2019), American economist
Frederic Fisher (1851–1943), British Royal Navy officer
Frederick Fisher (disambiguation), Fred Fisher or Freddie Fisher, multiple people
Fritz Fisher (born 1941), American baseball player

G
Gail Fisher (1935–2000), American actress
Garrett Fisher (born 1970), American composer
Garth Fisher (born 1958), American plastic surgeon
Gary Fisher (born 1950), American cyclist and engineer
Gary Fisher (footballer) (born 1992), Scottish footballer
Gavin Fisher (born 1964), American engineer
Gene Fisher, American poker player
Geoffrey Fisher (1887–1972), British religious leader
George Fisher (disambiguation), multiple people
Gerry Fisher (1926–2014), English cinematographer
Gideon Fisher (born 1965), Israeli lawyer
Gilbert Dempster Fisher (1906–1985), Scottish naturalist, writer and broadcaster
Gladys Caldwell Fisher (1907–1952), American sculptor
Grant Fisher (born 1997), Canadian-born American long-distance runner
Grant U. Fisher, American politician
Gregg S. Fisher, American investment manager
Gregor Fisher (born 1953), Scottish comedian and actor
Gus Fisher (1885–1972), American baseball player
Gus Fisher (fashion) (1920–2010), New Zealand philanthropist
Guy Fisher (born 1947), American mobster

H
H. A. L. Fisher (1865–1940), English historian, educator and politician
Ham Fisher (1900/01–1955), American artist/cartoonist
Harold Fisher (disambiguation), multiple people
Harrison Fisher (1875 or 1877 – 1934), American illustrator
Harry Fisher (disambiguation), multiple people
Hart D. Fisher, American writer
Harvey Sid Fisher (born 1940), American musician
Hayes Fisher, 1st Baron Downham (1853–1920), British politician
Heather Fisher (born 1984), English rugby union and rugby sevens player
Hector Fisher, Swiss tennis player
Helen Fisher (disambiguation), multiple people
Hendrick Fisher (1697–1779), American politician
Hendrick V. Fisher (1846–1909), American businessman and politician
Henry Fisher (disambiguation), multiple people
Herbert Fisher (disambiguation), multiple people
Herman Fisher (1898–1975), American businessman
Horace Fisher (1903–1974), English cricketer
Horace Fisher (painter) (1861–1928), British painter
Horatio Gates Fisher (1838–1890), American politician
Howard T. Fisher (1903–1979), American architect, city planner and educator
Hubert Fisher (1877–1941), American politician
Hugh Fisher (disambiguation), multiple people
Hugo Anton Fisher (1854–1916), Czechoslovakian-born American painter

I
Ian Fisher (disambiguation), multiple people
Idwal Fisher (1935–2012), Welsh rugby union and league player
India Fisher (born 1974), British actress
Ingals Fisher (1909–1942), American sport shooter
Ira Joe Fisher (born 1947), American journalist
Irving Fisher (1867–1947), American economist and activist
Isaac Fisher (1851–1944), Australian cricket umpire
Isaac Fisher (educator) (1877–1957), American educator
Isla Fisher (born 1976), Australian actress, voice actress and writer
Ivan Fisher (born 1943), American lawyer

J
J. Fisher (Yorkshire cricketer), English cricketer
Jackie Fisher (disambiguation), multiple people
Jake Fisher (born 1993), American football player
James Fisher (disambiguation), multiple people
Jameson Fisher (born 1995), American baseball player
Jane Lane, Lady Fisher (c. 1626 – 1689), English activist
Janice Fisher, American politician
Jasen Fisher, American child actor
Jasper Fisher (fl. 1639), English divine and dramatist
Jean Fisher (1942–2016), English art critic
Jeannie Fisher (born 1947), Scottish actress
Jeff Fisher (disambiguation) or Jeffrey Fisher, multiple people
Jennifer Fisher (art historian), Canadian art historian and curator
Jennifer Fisher (designer), American jewelry designer
Jeremy Fisher (disambiguation), multiple people
Jerrold Fisher, American composer
Jerry Fisher (born 1942), American singer
Jessica Fisher (born 1976), American poet, translator and critic
Jimbo Fisher (born 1965), American football player and coach
Jimmie Lou Fisher (1941-2022), American politician
Jo Fisher, New Zealand soccer player
Joan Fisher (born 1949), Canadian sprinter
Jodie Fisher (born 1960), American actress
Joel Fisher (disambiguation), multiple people
Joely Fisher (born 1967), American actress and singer
John Fisher (disambiguation), Jackie Fisher or Jack Fisher, multiple people
Jon Fisher (born 1972), American entrepreneur, philanthropist and inventor
Jon Fisher (rugby union) (born 1988), English rugby union player
Jonah Fisher, British television journalist
Jonathan Fisher (disambiguation), multiple people
Jordan Fisher (born 1994), American singer, dancer and actor
Joseph Fisher (disambiguation) or Joe Fisher, multiple people
Josh Fisher (born c. 1950s), American computer scientist
Josh Fisher (basketball) (born 1980), American basketball player and coach
Joshua Fisher (merchant) (1707–1783), American merchant and cartographer
Joshua Fisher (Massachusetts politician), colonial Massachusetts politician
Joshua Fisher (musician) (born 1989), English singer-songwriter
Joshua Francis Fisher (1807–1873), American author and philanthropist
Jules Fisher (born 1937), American lighting designer
Juni Fisher (born c. 1957), American musician
Junior Fisher (born 1978), Caymanian footballer
Justin Fisher (disambiguation), multiple people

K
Kate Fisher (1850–1940), American prostitute, also known as Big Nose Kate
Kathleen Fisher, American computer scientist
Kelly Fisher (born 1978), British snooker player
Ken Fisher (disambiguation), multiple people
Kendra Fisher (born 1979), Canadian ice hockey player
Kenneth Fisher (born 1950), American financial manager and journalist
Kenneth Fisher (educationalist) (1882–1945), British educationalist
Kevin Fisher (disambiguation), multiple people
King Fisher (1853–1884), American gunslinger
Kitty Fisher (died 1767), British courtesan
Kyle Fisher (born 1994), American soccer player

L
Lala Fisher (1872–1929), Australian poet, writer and editor
Lamar Fisher, American politician
Larry Fisher (1907–2001), American real estate developer
Larry Fisher (murderer) (1949–2015), Canadian criminal
Laurie Fisher, Australian rugby union coach
Lavinia Fisher (1793–1820), American serial killer
Lee Fisher (born 1951), American businessman, lawyer and politician
Leigh Fisher (born 1984), Australian rules footballer and umpire
Lenora Fisher (born 1937), Canadian swimmer
Leonard Fisher (1881–1963), English Anglican bishop
Leonard Everett Fisher (born 1924), American artist
Les Fisher (born 1941), Royal Australian Air Force officer
Leslie Fisher (1906–1988), English Anglican priest
Lester E. Fisher, American zoologist
Lettice Fisher (1875–1956), British economist
Levar Fisher (born 1979), American football player
Lillian Estelle Fisher (1891–1988), American historian
Linda Fisher, American businesswoman
Lorraine Fisher (1928–2007), American baseball player
Lotan Fisher, Israeli bridge player
Louis Fisher (1913–2001), American politician
Louis Matshwenyego Fisher, Botswana general
Lucy Fisher (born 1949), American film producer

M
Marc Fisher, American journalist
Margaret Fisher (c.  1874 – 1958), wife of Andrew Fisher, Prime Minister of Australia
Maria Anna Fisher (1819–1911), American businesswoman
Marie Fisher (1931–2008), Australian politician
Mark Fisher (disambiguation), multiple people
Martin Fisher (disambiguation), multiple people
Mary Fisher (disambiguation), multiple people
Matthew Fisher (disambiguation), multiple people
Matthew Fisher (musician) (born 1946), English musician
Matthew Fisher (English cricketer) (born 1997), English cricketer
Matthew P. A. Fisher (born 1960), American theoretical physicist
Maurice Fisher (1931–2022), American baseball player
Max Fisher (1908–2005), American businessman and philanthropist
Mea Fisher, American DJ
Mel Fisher (1922–1998), American treasure hunter
M. F. K. Fisher (1908–1992), American writer
Michoel Fisher (c. 1910 – 2004), British rabbi and Talmudic scholar
Mickey Fisher (politician) (1940–2021), Canadian politician
Mickey Fisher (basketball) (1904/05–1963), American basketball coach
Mika'ela Fisher, German actress, film director, writer, producer, model and tailor
Mike Fisher (ice hockey) (born 1980), Canadian hockey player
Miles Fisher (born 1983), American actor and musician
Morgan Fisher (born 1950), English musician
Morgan Fisher (artist) (born 1942), American filmmaker and artist
Morris Fisher (1890–1968), American sport shooter
Morton P. Fisher (1897–1965), United States Tax Court judge
Myrta Fisher (1917–1999), British artist

N
Nate Fisher (born 1996), American baseball player
Nathan Fisher (born 1989), English footballer
Neil Fisher (born 1970), English footballer
Nellie Ivy Fisher (1907–1995), London-born industrial chemist 
Newt Fisher (1871–1947), American baseball player
Nigel Fisher (1913–1996), British politician
Nigel Fisher (United Nations), Canadian diplomat
Noel Fisher (disambiguation), multiple people
Norm Fisher (born 1963), Canadian bass guitarist
Norman Fisher (disambiguation), multiple people

O
Oatten Fisher (1924–2006), American player of Canadian football
O. C. Fisher (1903–1994), American politician and writer
Oliver Fisher (born 1988), English golfer
Oniel Fisher (born 1991), Jamaican footballer
Oscar Fisher (1812–1882), American politician
Osmond Fisher (1817–1914), English geologist

P
Paddy Fisher (born 1998), American football player
Patrice Fisher (born 1978), American actress
Paul Fisher (disambiguation), multiple people
Payne Fisher (1616–1693), English poet
Peter Fisher (disambiguation), multiple people
Philip Fisher (disambiguation), multiple people
Phineas Fisher, unidentified hacktivist

R
Raymond Fisher (disambiguation) or Ray Fisher, multiple people
Rebecca Fisher (disambiguation) or Becky Fisher, multiple people
Red Fisher (disambiguation), multiple people
Reggie Fisher (born 1948), American record producer
Reginald Fisher (disambiguation) or Reg Fisher, multiple people
Rhett Fisher (born 1980), American actor, writer and record producer
Rich Fisher (news anchor) (1949–2017), American news anchor
Richard Fisher (disambiguation), multiple people
Rick Fisher (disambiguation), multiple people
Robert Fisher (disambiguation) or Rob Fisher, multiple people
Robert William Fisher (born 1961) American Fugitive
Robin Fisher (disambiguation), multiple people
Robson Fisher (1921–2000), British educationalist and headmaster
Roger Fisher (disambiguation), multiple people
Rolland Fisher (1900–1982), American religious leader and activist
Ron Fisher (disambiguation), multiple people
Ronald Fisher (1890–1962), British eugenicist, statistician, and geneticist
Rose-Lynn Fisher (born 1955), American photographer
Ross Fisher (born 1980), English golfer
Ross Fisher (footballer) (born 1964), Australian rules footballer
Rowland Fisher (1885–1969), English painter
Roy Fisher (1930–2017), British poet
Roy M. Fisher (1918–1999), American journalist
Rudolph Fisher (1897–1934), American writer
Ryan Fisher (born 1983), American motorcycle speedway rider
Ryan Fisher (triathlete) (born 1991), Australian triathlete

S
Sallie Fisher (1880–1950), American actress
Sally Caldwell Fisher (born 1951), American painter
Sam Fisher (disambiguation), multiple people
Samuel Fisher (disambiguation), multiple people
Sandra Fisher (1947–1994), American painter
Sarah Fisher (born 1980), American racing driver
Scott Fisher (disambiguation), multiple people
Seth Fisher (1972–2006), American comics artist
Shannon Fisher, American radio personality, activist and writer
Shea Fisher (born 1988), Australian singer
Shireen Avis Fisher, American judge
Showboat Fisher (1899–1994), American baseball player
Shug Fisher (1907–1984), American actor, singer, songwriter, musician and comedian
Sidney George Fisher, American lawyer and author
Simon Fisher (born 1970), British geneticist and neuroscientist
Sonny Fisher (1931–2005), American singer-songwriter and guitarist
Spencer O. Fisher (1843–1919), American politician
Spencer Fisher (born 1976), American mixed martial artist
Stan Fisher (1911–1961), Australian rules footballer
Stanley Fisher (1867–1949), Chief Justice of Ceylon
Steve Fisher (disambiguation), multiple people
Steven Fisher (disambiguation), multiple people
Stink Fisher (born 1970), American actor and restaurateur
Stu Fisher, English musician
Susan Fisher (disambiguation), multiple people
Sydney Fisher (disambiguation), multiple people
Sylvia Fisher (1910–1996), Australian opera singer

T
Tanya Fisher, Australian women's basketball player
Ted Fisher (1887–1954), Australian rules footballer
Terence Fisher (1904–1980), British film director
Terry Louise Fisher (born 1946), American screenwriter and producer 
Theodosia Abrams Fisher (1770–1849), English singer
Thomas Fisher (disambiguation), multiple people
Timothy S. Fisher (born 1969), American educator and engineer
TJ Fisher, American writer
Todd Fisher (born 1958), American actor, director, cinematographer, producer and curator
Tom Fisher (disambiguation), multiple people
Toni Fisher (1924–1999), American singer
Tony Fisher (disambiguation), multiple people
Travis Fisher (born 1979), American football player
Trevor Fisher Jnr (born 1979), South African golfer
Tricia Leigh Fisher (born 1968), American actress and singer
Tyler Fisher (born 1993), South African rugby union player

V
 Vardis Fisher (1895–1968), American historical novelist
 Venessa Fisher (born 1985), British-Canadian dancer, singer and model
 Vernon Fisher (born 1943), American artist
 Vic Fisher (1924–1999), Australian rules footballer
 Victor Fisher (1870–1954), British activist
 Vilyam Genrikhovich Fisher (1903–1971), better known as Rudolf Abel, Soviet intelligence agent
 Violet L. Fisher, American United Methodist bishop
 Viv Fisher (born 1952), British audio engineer and musician

W
Walter Fisher (disambiguation), multiple people
Warren Fisher, British civil servant
Warren Fisher (rugby league), Australian rugby league player
Warren Samuel Fisher (1878–1971), American entomologist
Welthy Honsinger Fisher (1879–1980), American activist
Wilbur Fisher (1894–1960), American baseball player
William Fisher (disambiguation), multiple people
Woolf Fisher (1912–1975), New Zealand businessman and philanthropist

Y
Yisroel Yaakov Fisher (1928–2003), Israeli rabbi

Z
Zachary Fisher (1910–1999), American businessman and philanthropist, founder of Fisher House Foundation

Fictional characters
Donald Fisher (Home and Away), a character in the soap opera Home and Away
Elena Fisher, a character in the video game series Uncharted
Jeremy Fisher, a character in the children's book The Tale of Mr. Jeremy Fisher
Kris Fisher, a character in the soap opera Hollyoaks
Malachy Fisher, a character in the soap opera Hollyoaks
Nate Fisher, a character in the television series Six Feet Under
Phryne Fisher, protagonist of a series of detective novels by Kerry Greenwood
Ruth Fisher, a character in the television series Six Feet Under
Sam Fisher (Splinter Cell), protagonist of the video game series Splinter Cell

See also
Ann Fisher-Wirth (born 1947), American poet
Norman Fisher-Jones (fl. late 20th century), British musician
Simon Fisher-Becker, British actor
Baron Fisher
A Stone for Danny Fisher, a novel

References

English-language surnames
Occupational surnames
English-language occupational surnames